The Tees Valley Giants was intended as a £15 million series of five art installations by sculptor Anish Kapoor and structural designer Cecil Balmond.
The artwork was planned to be created in the towns of Darlington, Hartlepool, Middlesbrough, Redcar and Stockton on Tees in the Tees Valley area of England.
The project was launched in July 2008 by Tees Valley Regeneration.
If completed, the project would become the world's biggest public art project.

The structures 
Five structures were planned: however only one, Temenos, has been unveiled. However, in September 2012, Kapoor insisted the other projects would go ahead. But by September 2016 no progress had been announced.

Temenos 
Temenos was the first sculpture for the Tees Valley Giants project to be announced.
The steel structure consists of a pole, a circular ring and an oval ring, all held together by steel wire.
The structure is situated in the Middlehaven area of Middlesbrough, close to where the Transporter bridge is located; construction work started in autumn 2008, was completed by spring 2010, and officially presented to the people of Middlesbrough on 10 June 2010.
The name 'Temenos' comes from the Ancient Greek (τέμενος < τέμνω, temno, to cut) term for land cut off and assigned as an official domain, especially to kings and chiefs, or a piece of land marked off from common uses and dedicated to a god, a sanctuary, holy grove or holy precinct.

Temenos was funded by the Government Initiative, The Northern Way, the regional development agency One NorthEast, the Arts Council England, the Northern Rock Foundation, Middlesbrough Football Club and BioRegional Quintain.

Other structures 
The other four structures were never formally announced, and in June 2012, the BBC revealed that plans for them had been put on hold: it currently seems unlikely that funding for them will be secured. In September 2012, Kapoor insisted all of the structures would go ahead, but the project then slipped out of the news until May 2018 when Stockton Council was hoping to revive the scheme by seeking funding from Tees Valley Combined Authority for a second sculpture.

References

External links 

 Anish Kapoor Official Site

Places in the Tees Valley
Buildings and structures in Hartlepool
Buildings and structures in Middlesbrough
Redcar and Cleveland
Buildings and structures in Stockton-on-Tees
Outdoor sculptures in England
Sculptures by Anish Kapoor
Borough of Darlington
Steel sculptures in England
2010 sculptures